Sladen's barbet (Gymnobucco sladeni) is a species of bird in the Lybiidae family (African barbets).
It is found in the Central African Republic and the Democratic Republic of the Congo.

Its common name and Latin binomial commemorate the British collector Major A. G. Sladen.

References

Sladen's barbet
Birds of Central Africa
Sladen's barbet
Taxonomy articles created by Polbot